Lanping Bai and Pumi Autonomous County (Bai: Ketdant Baifcuf Pupmipcuf zibzibxiand) is located in Nujiang Lisu Autonomous Prefecture, Yunnan province, China.

Administrative divisions
Lanping Bai and Pumi Autonomous County has 4 towns and 4 townships. 
4 towns

4 townships

Climate
Like most of Yunnan, Lanping has a dry-winter subtropical highland climate (Köppen climate classification: Cwb
)

See also
Three Parallel Rivers of Yunnan Protected Areas - Unesco World Heritage Site

References

External links

Lanping County 

County-level divisions of Nujiang Prefecture
Bai people
Pumi people
Autonomous counties of the People's Republic of China